Brown Glacier is a glacier just south of Round Hill on the east side of Heard Island in the southern Indian Ocean. Its terminus is at Brown Lagoon. To the northwest of Brown Glacier is Compton Glacier, whose terminus is located at Compton Lagoon, between Gilchrist Beach and Fairchild Beach. To the southeast of Brown Glacier is Stephenson Glacier, whose terminus is located between Dovers Moraine and Stephenson Lagoon.

Discovery and naming
Brown Glacier was surveyed by ANARE (Australian National Antarctic Research Expeditions) in 1948. Named by Antarctic Names Committee of Australia (ANCA) for K.G. Brown, ANARE biologist on Heard Island in 1951.

References

Further reading

External links
A map of Heard Island and McDonald Islands, including all major topographical features
Australian Antarctic Division
Australian Antarctic Gazetteer
Composite Gazetteer of Antarctica
Australian Antarctic Names and Medals Committee (AANMC)
Scientific Committee on Antarctic Research (SCAR)
 

Glaciers of Heard Island and McDonald Islands